Cyprus is a destination country for women who are subjected to trafficking in persons, specifically forced prostitution, as well as for men and women in forced labor. Women identified as sex trafficking victims in Cyprus originated from Moldova, Ukraine, Bulgaria, the Philippines, Morocco, and Hungary. A large number of Romanian nationals were subjected to forced labor in the country in 2009. Sex trafficking occurs within venues used by Cyprus' commercial sex industry, including cabarets, bars, pubs, and massage parlors disguised as private apartments located throughout the country. Groups vulnerable to forced labor include domestic workers, asylum seekers, and migrants working in the farming and agricultural sectors. According to a 2008 EU Thematic Study on Child Trafficking for Cyprus, some children within migrant and Roma communities may be vulnerable to trafficking.

The Republic of Cyprus does not fully comply with the minimum standards for the elimination of trafficking; however, it is making some efforts to do so. The government drafted and passed a new National Action Plan and convicted an increased number of traffickers in 2009. However, during the reporting period, the government identified fewer sex trafficking victims, failed to consistently provide financial and social support services to trafficking victims, and did not effectively address trafficking-related complicity, which local observers report is hampering the government's anti-trafficking efforts.

The U.S. State Department's Office to Monitor and Combat Trafficking in Persons placed the country in "Tier 2"  in 2017.

Prosecution
Cyprus made some progress in its anti-trafficking law enforcement efforts in 2009 by convicting an increased number of traffickers; however, overall sentences for trafficking-related offenses remained inadequate. Cyprus prohibits both sex and labor trafficking through Law 87 (I)/2007, which also contains protection measures for victims. Although the penalties prescribed for sex trafficking range up to 20 years' imprisonment, these penalties are not commensurate with those prescribed for other serious crimes, such as rape, for which the maximum sentence is life in prison. During the reporting period, police investigated 57 persons in 17 suspected trafficking cases, compared with 70 persons in 29 suspected trafficking cases in 2008. Of the 17 trafficking cases, eight were sent to court, seven are still under investigation, and two were "otherwise disposed of". The government convicted ten sex trafficking offenders in 2009, compared with one in 2008, and courts handed down harsher penalties for some traffickers. Sentences ranged from a $4,400 fine to four years in prison. Local observers reported, however, that the Attorney General's Office downgraded trafficking cases and sometimes tried anti-trafficking cases in lower courts, which are less equipped to deal with serious offenses.

In November 2009, police arrested and charged three suspects for subjecting 110 Romanians to forced labor, mostly in the construction sector; the ringleader reportedly used debt bondage and hired enforcers to control the workers, who were forced to live in converted shipping containers in an isolated industrial area near Nicosia. Cypriot police actively investigated the case with law enforcement counterparts in Romania; however, a district court released the main suspect after rejecting a fourth request by police for his detention. In 2009, police conducted 95 anti-trafficking raids and 20 undercover operations on establishments suspected of trafficking. Stakeholders reported that police inspected significantly fewer cabarets in 2009. The Department of Labor (DOL) is responsible for inspecting work premises associated with the new "performing artist" work permits; however, no DOL inspectors work after-hours, when "performing artists" are most subject to exploitation in cabarets.

The government in 2009 added an additional member to its four-person police anti-trafficking unit; NGOs, however, report that the police still lack sufficient investigative resources to vigorously combat trafficking throughout the island. In 2008, the police presented a report to the House Human Rights Committee stating, according to local media, that traffickers "have influence on government officials, which makes the arrest and prosecution of traffickers more difficult."

A pending complicity investigation from 2008, involving four police officers who allegedly patronized a cabaret, has yet to be concluded. In 2007, the government transferred a police officer out of his unit for allegedly raping a trafficking victim; the court determined that the main witnesses in the case were unreliable, and the prosecution against the officer was dropped.

Protection
The Government of Cyprus made limited but inconsistent progress in ensuring that trafficking victims received necessary protective services over the last year. It continued to fund its own shelter dedicated for trafficking victims, allocating $280,000 for its operation in 2009. The government cared for a total of 47 trafficking victims in the shelter in 2009, compared with 59 victims assisted in 2008. In 2009, the government allocated $235,000 in funding for additional victim assistance, and the Department of Social Welfare Services reported assisting 66 female victims of commercial sexual exploitation and 163 male and female victims of labor exploitation.

Although Cyprus' anti-trafficking law mandates referral of trafficking victims to the government's social welfare services and to the government shelter, it did not employ procedures for front-line responders to proactively identify potential victims during the year, sustaining a long-standing deficiency. NGOs report that the government's failure to recognize their critical role in protection negatively impacted on the government's ability to provide meaningful protection to trafficking victims. In 2009, the government identified a total of 114 new victims of trafficking, the majority of whom were from a forced labor ring involving Romanian nationals; it identified 21 sex trafficking victims in 2009, compared with 41 victims the government identified last year, the majority of whom were sex trafficking victims. The government reported it repatriated 50 of the Romanian labor trafficking victims; the other identified victims reportedly received 45 days of financial support from the government as well as job placement assistance and vocational training.

During the year, the government allowed some victims to stay at the shelter longer than the four weeks prescribed by law. NGOs reported, however, that social services and psychological treatment at the shelter were inadequate, particularly for trafficking victims who do not speak the local languages. Although the government reported that all victims are entitled to long-term housing and welfare benefits, NGOs reported that several victims did not receive their full allowances on a consistent and timely basis. While the government provided some protections to a key prosecution witness from the Dominican Republic and allowed her to stay in the government shelter longer than four weeks, in comments to the media she reported overall inadequate treatment by the government. The government lacks a systematic procedure for the repatriation and safe return of trafficking victims. The government encouraged victims to participate in investigations of trafficking offenders and reported that all identified trafficking victims cooperated with law enforcement in 2009. However, cabaret owners and agents reportedly used attorneys to bribe potential witnesses, and pressured women to withdraw complaints or not follow through with testifying in court. In January 2010, the European Court of Human Rights found that Cyprus failed to adequately protect a trafficking victim from Russia who died in 2001 under suspicious circumstances.

Prevention
The government did not implement any comprehensive campaigns to specifically address demand within the context of Cyprus, or to educate clients about the realities of forced prostitution inherent to the island's sex industry, a long-standing deficiency. The government recently approved a 2010–2012 National Action Plan to combat human trafficking that calls for demand-focused public awareness campaigns and cooperation with NGOs to conduct outreach at universities, army camps, and other venues. The government also provided over $8,000 to a radio station for programming throughout the year that specifically addressed human trafficking in Cyprus.

Although the government reported it adopted a new policy to screen applications for foreign "performing artists", the work permit category that replaced the previous "artiste visa", some NGOs indicated that the revised policy had little actual impact on reducing trafficking in Cyprus' commercial sex industry. However, the government reported a nearly 40 percent decrease in the number of cabarets operating during the reporting period. During the reporting period, the government reported it issued 1,225 "performing artist" work permits and 20 "creative artist" permits; these numbers include renewals and changes of employer. The government reported that, as of February 2010, there were 331 performing artists in Cyprus. One NGO reported a sharp increase in the issuance of "barmaid" work permits in 2009; the government reported it issued 467 such permits in 2009, up from 422 issued during the previous reporting period. Another NGO questioned the government's official statistics on trafficking, speculating that a number of trafficking victims were intentionally left out of the statistics to indicate a smaller problem.

See also
Human rights in Cyprus

References

Cyprus
Cyprus
Cyprus
Human rights abuses in Cyprus
Crime in Cyprus by type